Drown with Me may refer to:
 Drown with Me, a song by Porcupine Tree from In Absentia
 Drown with Me, a song by Make them Suffer from How to Survive a Funeral